Guarino is an Italian name that is derived from the word guardia or guardiano meaning ‘to guard’ or ‘to protect’.  The name refers to several notable people:

Given name
 Guarin (c. 1100–1137), Siculo-Norman (later Italy) general and chancellor
 Guarino da Verona (1370–1460), Renaissance humanist
 Guarino Guarini (1624–1683), Italian artist
 Guarino Moretti, a.k.a. Willie Moretti (1894–1951), Italian-American mafioso

Surname

 Battista Guarino (1434–1513), Renaissance humanist
 Claudio Guarino (1966-2004), Italian-born multimedia visual artis
 Francesco Guarino (1611–1651 or 1654), Italian painter of the Baroque period
 Giuseppe Guarino (cardinal) (1827-1897), Italian Roman Catholic Archbishop of Messina and cardinal
 Giuseppe Guarino (film director) (1885-1963), Italian film director, producer and screenwriter
 Giuseppe Guarino (politician) (1922–2020), Italian legal scholar and politician
 Javier Guarino (born 1986), Uruguayan footballer
 Nicola Guarino (born 1954), group leader of the Laboratory for Applied Ontology and co-creator of the OntoClean methodology
 Laetitia Guarino, Miss Switzerland 2014
 Lawrence Nicholas "Larry" Guarino (1922–2014), a U.S. Air Force officer, and veteran of three wars
 Martin Guarino (born 1990), Argentine professional footballer 
 Philip Guarino (1907–1993), former priest and alleged Freemason associated with Licio Gelli and George H. W. Bush
 Rita Guarino (born 1971), Italian football manager
 Robin Guarino (born 1960), female opera and film director
 Stephen Guarino (born 1975), American actor and comedian

See also
Guarinus (disambiguation)

Italian masculine given names
Italian-language surnames